Sidmouth College is a coeducational secondary school and sixth form, located in Sidmouth in the English county of Devon. The school attracts pupils from as far afield as Exmouth and Exeter. 

In February 2012 the college was deemed 'Good' by Ofsted, with 852 students on roll.  This level of improvement in the College's provision followed its last inspection (May 2009) when it was deemed 'satisfactory'. After the 2005 Ofsted report, when there were 869 students on roll, it was also deemed 'satisfactory'.

previously a community school administered by Devon County Council, in March 2023 Sidmouth College converted to academy status. The school is now sponsored by The Ted Wragg Multi Academy Trust.

Sidmouth College offers  GCSEs and BTECs as programmes of study for pupils, while students in the sixth form have the option to study from a range of A-levels and further BTECs. The school also has a specialism in technology.

Notable former pupils
Duncan James, singer and member of Blue
Oliver Farnworth, actor.

References

External links
Sidmouth College official website

Secondary schools in Devon
Academies in Devon
Sidmouth